Old Al Ghanim is a neighborhood of Doha, the capital of Qatar, located in the municipality of Ad Dawhah. It forms a part of Doha's historic downtown. A notable landmark was the New World Centre, a supermarket established in 1987. It has since been relocated. Numerous other local businesses have also been relocated to other parts of Doha by the Ministry of Municipality and Environment so it could carry out massive-scale reconstruction of the neighborhood and clear out portions to make way for the Doha Metro. The Al Ghanim Central Bus station is another important landmark found here.

Infrastructure
Indian healthcare company Aster DM Healthcare opened a clinic in Old Al Ghanim in October 2014.

Transport
Transportation company Mowasalat's main bus station is located in Old Al Ghanim.

Major roads that run through the district are Grand Hamad Street, Ahmed Bin Mohammed Bin Thani Street, Jabr Bin Mohammed Street, B Ring Road, Ras Abu Aboud Street and Airport Street.

Demographics
As of the 2010 census, the district comprised 3,424 housing units and 887 establishments. There were 17,692 people living in the district, of which 87% were male and 13% were female. Out of the 17,692 inhabitants, 91% were 20 years of age or older and 9% were under the age of 20.

Employed persons made up 84% of the population. Females accounted for 3% of the working population, while males accounted for 97% of the working population.

Gallery

References

Communities in Doha